Tannay is a commune in the Nièvre department in central France, region of Bourgogne-Franche-Comté.

Geography 

The village is built on a hill, providing a significant point of view over the Yonne valley. The Canal du Nivernais (Nièvre lock) is navigable.

Points of interest 

Tannay Port (nautical base camp), collegiate church Saint-Léger from the 13th century. This village is on the Vezelay branch of the Route of Saint Jacques de Compostelle, about 5h on foot from the cathedral of Vézelay Abbey

Town partnerships
Tannay fosters partnerships with the following places:
 Norheim, Rhineland-Palatinate, Germany since 1967

Notable people from Tannay
 André-Charles Brottier

See also
Communes of the Nièvre department

References

Communes of Nièvre